Jason Dickinson (born July 4, 1995) is a Canadian professional ice hockey forward currently playing for the Chicago Blackhawks of the National Hockey League (NHL). He was selected by the Dallas Stars in the first round, 29th overall, of the 2013 NHL Entry Draft.

Playing career
Dickinson was rated as a top prospect who fulfilled the expectation to be a first round selection at the 2013 NHL Entry Draft, being chosen 29th overall by the Dallas Stars. Dickinson joined the Guelph Storm of the Ontario Hockey League (OHL) for the 2011–12 season and was recognized for his stand-out play when he was named to the OHL Second All-Rookie Team. The following season he was invited to take part in the CHL Top Prospects Game, and was then selected to play with the gold medal-winning Canadian squad at the 2013 IIHF World U18 Championships. In the 2013–14 season, Dickinson helped the Storm capture the OHL championship before losing to the Edmonton Oil Kings in the Memorial Cup finals.

On May 29, 2014, Dickinson signed a three-year, entry-level contract with the Dallas Stars. Upon completion of his junior season, on April 16, 2015, he was assigned to finish the 2014–15 season with Dallas' American Hockey League (AHL) affiliate, the Texas Stars.

On April 7, 2016, in a game against the Colorado Avalanche, Dickinson made his NHL debut and scored his first NHL goal.

Following his sixth year within the Stars organization, at the conclusion of the  season, due to expansion draft considerations, Dickinson was traded to the Vancouver Canucks in exchange for a third round pick in the 2021 NHL Entry Draft on July 17, 2021. As a restricted free agent, Dickinson agreed to terms on a three-year, $7.95 million contract extension with the Canucks on August 14, 2021. 

Approaching the  season, on October 7, 2022, after just one season in Vancouver, Dickinson was traded along with a second-round pick in 2024 to the Chicago Blackhawks in exchange for defenseman Riley Stillman. Dickinson record one goal and two assists in his debut with the Blackhawks against the San Jose Sharks on October 15.

Personal life
Dickinson's younger brother Josh also plays hockey; he signed an entry-level contract with the Colorado Avalanche in 2018. They are of Scottish and Caribbean heritage.

Career statistics

Regular season and playoffs

International

Awards and honours

References

External links
 

1995 births
Living people
Canadian ice hockey centres
Chicago Blackhawks players
Dallas Stars draft picks
Dallas Stars players
Guelph Storm players
Ice hockey people from Ontario
National Hockey League first-round draft picks
Texas Stars players
Vancouver Canucks players